Silence is a 2016 period drama film directed by Martin Scorsese and written by Jay Cocks and Scorsese, based on the 1966 novel of the same name by Shūsaku Endō. Set in Nagasaki, Japan, the film was shot entirely in Taiwan around Taipei. The film stars Andrew Garfield, Adam Driver, Liam Neeson, Tadanobu Asano, and Ciarán Hinds. The plot follows two 17th century Jesuit priests who travel from Portugal to Japan to locate their missing mentor, Cristóvão Ferreira, and spread Catholic Christianity. The story is set in the time of Kakure Kirishitan ("Hidden Christians"), following the suppression of the Shimabara Rebellion (1637–1638) of Japanese Roman Catholics against the Tokugawa shogunate.

A long-time passion project for Scorsese, which he developed for over 25 years, the film premiered at the Pontifical Oriental Institute in Rome on November 29, 2016, and was released in the United States on December 23, 2016. The American Film Institute and National Board of Review both selected Silence as one of their top ten films of the year. The film also received an Academy Award nomination for Best Cinematography at the 89th Academy Awards.

Silence is the last of Scorsese's trilogy of film epics about religious figures struggling with challenges to faith, following The Last Temptation of Christ (1988) and Kundun (1997).

Top ten lists
Silence was listed on numerous critics' top ten lists.

 1st – Justin Chang, Los Angeles Times
 1st – Rene Rodriguez, Miami Herald
 1st – Sean Mulvihill, FanboyNation
 2nd – Joshua Rothkopf, Time Out New York
 2nd – Glenn Kenny, RogerEbert.com
 3rd – Mark Olsen, Los Angeles Times
 3rd – Scott Tobias, The Village Voice
 4th – Ben Kenigsberg and Scout Tafoya, RogerEbert.com
 4th – William Bibbiani, CraveOnline
 4th – Chris Cabin and Brian Formo, Collider
 5th – Peter Travers, Rolling Stone
 5th – Stephanie Zacharek, Time
 5th – Patrick McGavin and Brian Tallerico, RogerEbert.com
 5th – Bilge Ebiri, LA Weekly
 6th – Katie Rife, The A.V. Club
 7th – Keith Phipps, Uproxx
 8th – Alissa Wilkinson, Vox
 8th – Aubrey Page, Collider
 8th – Witney Seibold, CraveOnline
 9th – Todd McCarthy, The Hollywood Reporter
 9th – Richard Roeper, Chicago Sun-Times
 9th – Ignatiy Vishnevetsky, The A.V. Club
 10th – Peter Sobczynski, RogerEbert.com
 Top 10 (listed alphabetically, not ranked) – Walter Addiego, San Francisco Chronicle
 Top 10 (listed alphabetically, not ranked) – Stephen Whitty, The Star-Ledger

Accolades
In addition to competitive awards for which the film received accolades, the American Film Institute and National Board of Review both selected Silence as one of their top ten films of the year.

See also
 Silence (1971 film), an earlier version directed by Masahiro Shinoda

References

External links
 

Silence